Stonewall is a town in the Canadian province of Manitoba with a population of 5,046 as of the 2021 census. It is known for its limestone quarries. The local festival is the Quarry Days which is usually held over three days in August on Main Street. The town is surrounded by the R.M. of Rockwood.

History 
When the last ice age retreated, as well as the prairies, escarpments such as Riding Mountain were left behind. In addition to these, smaller elevations were left behind such as Stony Mountain and Stonewall. It is believed that these escarpments were used as look-outs by early hunters approximately 4,000 to 5,000 years ago. These formations were later used as buffalo jumps by the indigenous populations.

Stonewall was founded by Samuel Jacob Jackson in 1878, after he acquired the land the town is built upon in 1875. However, Jackson did not move to Stonewall himself until 1881.

In the early 1880s, the quarry opened with the focus of their operation being the production of quicklime. During the peak times of the quarry, large amounts of dynamite was used for blasting the rock. The dynamite was kept in the powder magazine which has since been rebuilt near the entrance to Stonewall Quarry Park.

The construction of the line continued west passing through Stonewall, Hanlan and Meadow Lea before turning south-west towards Portage la Prairie during the summer of 1880. The transcontinental line was originally planned to pass through Selkirk, but was actually built through Winnipeg following heavy lobbying from the city. The line west of Stonewall was therefore rebuilt through Rosser. The line north-west from Stonewall was subsequently extended through Teulon, Komarno before eventually reaching Arborg in 1910. In 2008, the RM of Rockwood decided that the line was obsolete. With the city of Winnipeg's help the line was taken out.

The present town hall was built in 1912 using local limestone.

Following the closure of the quarry, Kinsmen Lake was developed on the site and opened to the public on August 10, 1956. The lake has become a popular location for locals and visitors to the town. In 1983, the town council initiated a project to develop the former quarry site around Kinsmen Lake into a historical site and natural area.

Demographics 

Education
Stonewall is situated in the Interlake school division and is served by three schools:
 École R. W. Bobby Bend School offers a dual-track (French Immersion and English) kindergarten to grade 4 students;
 École Stonewall Centennial School offers a dual-track program for grade 5 to 8 students; and
 Collège Stonewall Collegiate offers classes for grades 9-12.

Government

Municipal
Stonewall is represented by a Head of Council (Mayor), a Deputy Mayor and three councillors. The current incumbents of the positions are:
Mayor: Sandra Smith
Council: Walter Badger, Peter Bullivant, Ron Maryniuk, Kimberly Newman

Provincial
Stonewall is located in the Riding of Lakeside of Legislative Assembly of Manitoba and is currently represented by Ralph Eichler of the Progressive Conservative Party of Manitoba.

Federal
Stonewall is located in the Selkirk—Interlake electoral district which returns one Member of Parliament who currently is James Bezan of the Conservative Party of Canada.

The Winnipeg-Interlake division of the Senate is represented by Janis Johnson who was appointed by Brian Mulroney and who is a member of the Conservative Party of Canada.

Climate
Stonewall experiences a humid continental climate (Köppen Dfb) with warm to hot summers and cold winters

Sports

Stonewall is home to the Stonewall Jets of the MMJHL and the Stonewall Rams of the WHSHL.

Stonewall has two Hockey rinks: the Stonewall Arena (Ice Palace) and the Veterans Memorial Sports Complex. The only curling rink is the Sunova Credit Union Curling Rink.

Stonewall has a senior baseball team named the Stonewall Blue Jays.

Stonewall has one Soccer field: The Cooke Soccer Field.

Attractions

Stonewall Quarry Park

The Stonewall Quarry Park has been maintained as a natural area on the edge of town and provides picnic facilities, walking & biking trails for visitors and residents alike. The nine baseball diamonds are available for hire and have been used for the Blue Jays Cups in 1997 and 1998, the Pan Am Games in 1999 and the Western Canada Summer Games in 2003. There is also a campsite and swimming available in Kinsmen Lake. The Kinsmen Lake Splash Pad was opened in 2021 to the public. Stonewall Quarry Park also displays the many aspects of limestone production, one aspect includes The Kilns which were used for producing calcium oxide and quicklime in the late 1800's to mid 1900's. There was a museum and visitor centre, however these were destroyed by fire in the early hours of November 11, 2007. The new interpretive centre was opened in fall 2011.

Oak Hammock Marsh Interpretive Centre
The marsh is home to mammals, birds, amphibians, reptiles, fish and invertebrates. During the migration season, the number of waterfowl using the marsh can exceed 400,000 a day.

The Stonewall Post Office
The Stonewall Post Office is an example of the prairie style of architecture which was popular between late 19th and early 20th century. It was built in 1914 using local limestone and used as a post office until 1979. The Canadian Postmasters and Assistants Association was founded at the previous Stonewall post office in 1902.

Notable people
Alan Arnett McLeod - Stonewall born recipient of the Victoria Cross for actions performed in the skies above the town of Albert, France during the First World War
William Kurelek, painter, Member of the Order of Canada, raised on a farm near Stonewall
Holly Letkeman Professional wrestler signed to Impact! Wrestling under the ring-name Rosemary
Joey Dandeneau Drummer in Canadian rock band Theory of a Deadman

See also 

 List of towns in Manitoba
List of Communities in Manitoba by population

References

External links
Town of Stonewall

 
Towns in Manitoba
Winnipeg Metro Region